Firth is a city in Bingham County, Idaho, United States. The population was 477 at the 2010 census.

Geography
Firth is located at  (43.305519, -112.183938).

Firth is located on the eastern side of the Snake River, facing the Blackfoot Mountains.

History
Firth began as a Swedish settlement in 1885. It was named for Lorenzo J. Firth, an English emigrant, who gave land for the railroad section house and water tank; the railroad named the station for him in 1903. The post office was established in 1905.

Demographics

2010 census
At the 2010 census there were 477 people in 168 households, including 121 families, in the city. The racial makup of the city was 79.5% White, 2.1% Native American, 0.4% Pacific Islander, 14.5% from other races, and 3.6% from two or more races. Hispanic or Latino of any race were 25.2%.

Of the 168 households 42.3% had children under the age of 18 living with them, 57.1% were married couples living together, 10.7% had a female householder with no husband present, 4.2% had a male householder with no wife present, and 28.0% were non-families. 26.2% of households were one person and 14.3% were one person aged 65 or older. The average household size was 2.84 and the average family size was 3.45.

The median age was 31.4 years. 31.4% of residents were under the age of 18; 8.4% were between the ages of 18 and 24; 24.7% were from 25 to 44; 23.1% were from 45 to 64; and 12.2% were 65 or older. The gender makeup of the city was 50.5% male and 49.5% female.

2000 census
At the 2000 census there were 408 people in 142 households, including 100 families, in the city. The racial makup of the city was 70.34% White, 0.25% African American, 0.49% Native American, 20.83% from other races, and 8.09% from two or more races. Hispanic or Latino of any race were 29.17%.

Of the 142 households 42.3% had children under the age of 18 living with them, 59.9% were married couples living together, 8.5% had a female householder with no husband present, and 28.9% were non-families. 26.8% of households were one person and 15.5% were one person aged 65 or older.  The average household size was 2.87 and the average family size was 3.48.

The age distribution was 33.3% under the age of 18, 9.1% from 18 to 24, 25.2% from 25 to 44, 19.6% from 45 to 64, and 12.7% 65 or older.  The median age was 32 years. For every 100 females, there were 91.5 males.  For every 100 females age 18 and over, there were 100.0 males.

The median household income was $23,239 and the median income for a family was $27,500. Males had a median income of $27,292 versus $17,917 for females. The per capita income for the city was $10,458.  About 20.0% of families and 25.7% of the population were below the poverty line, including 39.8% of those under age 18 and 15.3% of those age 65 or over.

References

Cities in Idaho
Cities in Bingham County, Idaho